Sidney Johnson (born March 7, 1965) is a former American football cornerback in the National Football League for the Kansas City Chiefs and the Washington Redskins.  He played college football at the University of California.

Sidney currently resides in Ashburn, Virginia with his wife, Catrice. The Johnson's have four children, all boys. Nigel, the second oldest, currently plays basketball for the University of Virginia. He spent his freshman and sophomore seasons at Kansas State, before transferring to Rutgers for his junior campaign. After graduating from Rutgers, he transferred to the University of Virginia where he will complete his college career.

External links
Cal in the NFL
NFL.com player page

1965 births
Living people
Players of American football from Los Angeles
American football cornerbacks
Cerritos Falcons football players
California Golden Bears football players
Kansas City Chiefs players
Washington Redskins players